Nahatlatch Provincial Park and Protected Area is a provincial park in British Columbia, Canada, surrounding the Nahatlatch River in the southern Lillooet Ranges to the southwest of Lytton.  Access to the river and the park is via the Boston Bar-North Bend Bridge and the Nahatlatch Forest Service Road.

See also
Mehatl Creek Provincial Park

References

Lillooet Ranges
Provincial parks of British Columbia
Fraser Canyon
1999 establishments in British Columbia
Protected areas established in 1999